Colonel Antulio Segarra Guiot (January 20, 1906 – September 14, 1999) was a United States Army officer who in 1943 became the first Puerto Rican in history to command a Regular Army Regiment. Segarra served as Military Aide to the Military Governor of Puerto Rico Theodore Roosevelt, Jr. and during World War II commanded the 65th Infantry Regiment.

Early years
Antulio Segarra was born in Cayey, Puerto Rico where he received his primary and secondary education. His father was Lieutenant Colonel Rafael Segarra, a highly decorated World War I veteran. In 1923, Segarra received an appointment to the United States Military Academy at West Point from Horace Mann Towner (1855–1937), who served as Governor of Puerto Rico from 1923 to 1929.

Military career

Segarra graduated from West Point in 1927 and was commissioned a Second Lieutenant in the infantry. He was assigned as company commander of the 10th Infantry Regiment, at Fort Knox in Kentucky. The Regiment was later redesignated as the 5th Infantry Division and Segarra served until October 31, 1929, when the regiment was inactivated. He was then assigned as Military Aide to the Military Governor of Puerto Rico Theodore Roosevelt, Jr. (1887–1944) and served as such until 1931.

From 1931 to 1932, Segarra served with the 18th Infantry at Fort Wadsworth in Staten Island, New York and with the Camp Dix Civilian Conservation Corps in Burlington County, New Jersey from 1932 to 1936. He continued his military education in the Command and General Staff College (C&GSC) at Fort Leavenworth, Kansas. Segarra graduated from the C&GSC in 1942 and was assigned to the 296th Infantry Regiment of the Puerto Rican National Guard.

World War II
On November 25, 1943, Segarra succeeded Colonel John R. Mendenhall and assumed the command of Puerto Rico's 65th Infantry Regiment which at the time was conducting security missions in the jungles of Panama. Thus, Segarra became the first Puerto Rican Regular Army officer to command a Regular Army Regiment.

In January 1944, the Regiment was embarked for Jackson Barracks in New Orleans and later sent to Fort Eustis in Newport News, Virginia in preparation for overseas deployment to North Africa. After they arrived at Casablanca, they underwent further training.  By April 29, 1944, the Regiment had landed in Italy and moved on to Corsica. On June 21, 1944, Segarra was succeeded by Col. Paul G. Daly in the command of the 65th Infantry Regiment.

Post World War II
Segarra was assigned camp commander of Camp Stoneman in San Francisco, California. In 1950, upon the outbreak of the Korean War, Segarra was reassigned and served as troop commander of the men assigned to the 24th Infantry Division who were aboard the  headed for further training in Japan. Segarra served as Camp Commander at the G4 South West Command in Japan until 1951. He returned to Puerto Rico and served as Senior Advisor and Instructor to the Puerto Rico National Guard from 1952 to 1955. From 1955 to 1957, he served in the capacity of Inspector General of the Third United States Army and in the Requirements Section of the National Guard Bureau in Washington, D.C.

Later years
Segarra retired from the military in 1957 and as a civilian worked as vice president for the 1st Federal Savings and Loan Association until 1981 when he retired.

On September 14, 1999, Col. Antulio Segarra, died in San Juan, Puerto Rico and was survived by his wife, Evangelina Ledesma and two children Evangelinita and Antulio, Jr. He was buried September 16, with full military honors in the Puerto Rico National Cemetery located in Bayamon, Puerto Rico.

Awards and decorations
Among Segarra's military awards and decorations are the following:

See also

List of Puerto Ricans
List of Puerto Rican military personnel
Puerto Ricans in World War II
65th Infantry Regiment
French immigration to Puerto Rico
Borinqueneers Congressional Gold Medal

Notes

References

Further reading
Puertorriquenos Who Served With Guts, Glory, and Honor. Fighting to Defend a Nation Not Completely Their Own; by : Greg Boudonck; 
M1 All Good Men: A Lieutenant's Memories of the Korean War; By Robert F Hallahan, Pg. 13, Published 2003, iUniverse, .

1906 births
1999 deaths
People from Cayey, Puerto Rico
Puerto Rican military officers
Puerto Rican Army personnel
Recipients of the Legion of Merit
National Guard (United States) colonels
National Guard (United States) officers
United States Military Academy alumni
United States Army personnel of World War II
Puerto Rican people of French descent
United States Army Command and General Staff College alumni
Puerto Rico National Guard personnel
United States Army officers